The title Marquesses of Mancera is a hereditary title in the nobility of Castile and Grandees of Spain. The title was created by King Philip IV of Spain and given to Pedro de Toledo y Leiva, in the 17th century.

Origin
The Toledo  last name is a shortening of Álvarez de Toledo. In the 1570s, Pedro de Toledo, 8th son of García Álvarez de Toledo, 1st Duke of Alba, established a primogeniture over his estates and the surrounding lands, and became Lord of Mancera, Salmoral, Navarros, San Miguel, Montalbo and Gallegos, in the province of Avila, Castile-La Mancha, Spain.

Pedro de Toledo y Leiva, Lord of Mancera was granted the elevation of his title to Marquis on July 17, 1623.

Don Antonio Sebastián de Toledo, the second Marquis, was viceroy of New Spain from October 15, 1664, to December 8, 1673.

Marquesses and Marchionesses of Mancera
 Don Pedro de Toledo y Leiva, 1st Marquis of Mancera
 Don Antonio Sebastián de Toledo, 2nd Marquis of Mancera
 Don Pedro Sarmiento, 3rd Marquis of Mancera
 Doña Mariana Sarmiento de Vargas, 4th Marchioness of Mancera
 Doña Josefa Álvarez de Toledo, 5th Marchioness of Mancera
 Don Joaquín María Pimentel, 6th Marquis of Mancera
 Doña Maria Petronila Pimentel, 7th Marchioness of Mancera

Sources

Marquesses of Spain
Lists of Spanish nobility
1623 establishments in Spain